From 1885 until 1966 the area of Southern Africa that is now Botswana was part of the Bechuanaland Protectorate of Great Britain.

In June 1964, Britain accepted proposals for democratic self-government in Botswana. The seat of government was moved from Mahikeng in South Africa, to newly established in Gaberones (now Gaborone) in 1965. The 1965 constitution led to the first general elections and to independence on September 30, 1966.

The United States immediately recognized the new nation and moved to establish diplomatic relations. An embassy in Gaberones was established on September 30, 1966—independence day for Botswana.  Charles H. Pletcher was appointed as  ad interim pending the appointment of an ambassador. He served June 1970–September 1971.

Ambassadors

Note: Charles H. Pletcher served as chargé d'affaires September 1966–June 1970. W. Kennedy Cromwell III

Notes

See also
Botswana–United States relations
Foreign relations of Botswana
Ambassadors of the United States

References

United States Department of State: Background notes on Botswana

External links
 United States Department of State: Chiefs of Mission for Botswana
 United States Department of State: Botswana
 United States Embassy in Gaborone

Botswana

United States